The Saturniinae or saturniines are a subfamily of the family Saturniidae. They are commonly known as emperor moths or wild silk moths. They are easily spotted by the eyespots on the upper surface of their wings. Some exhibit realistic eye-like markings, whilst others have adapted the eyespots to form crescent moon or angular shapes or have lost their wing scales to create transparent windows. They are medium to very large moths, with adult wingspans ranging from 7.5 to 15 cm, in some cases even more. They consist of some of the largest sized Lepidoptera, such as the luna moth, atlas moth, and many more. The Saturniinae is an important source of wild silk and human food in many different cultures.

The saturniine genera, approximately 169 in number, are divided into four major and one minor (Micragonini) tribes. The genus Adafroptilum presently consists of a group of species with undetermined relationships.

Adults in the Saturniinae typically live about 5–12 days and are mostly nocturnal, excluding males in four of the subfamilies. The moths do not eat during their short lives and their mouths are not fully formed. In some species of Saturniinae, there is unmistakable sexual dimorphism. The females in these subfamilies can weigh almost double that of the males, are larger in size, and have larger wings.

The Saturniinae's eggs are oblong and are laid flat against each other in clusters. Once hatched, the larval period lasts about 78 days. They typically pass through five larval instars (excluding egg, pupa and adult), although some may have more. The pupal stage takes place in an often yellowish cocoon. In this stage, they resemble small wooden barrels in shape and color.

Genera

Tribe Attacini
 Archaeoattacus
 Attacus
 Callosamia
 Coscinocera
 Epiphora
 Eupackardia
 Hyalophora
 Rhodinia
 Rothschildia Grote, 1896
 Samia

Tribe Bunaeini Packard, 1902
 Athletes
 Aurivillius
 Bunaea
 Bunaeopsis
 Cinabra
 Cirina
 Eochroa
 Gonimbrasia
 Gynanisa
 Heniocha
 Imbrasia
 Leucopteryx
 Lobobunaea
 Melanocera
 Nudaurelia
 Protogynanisa
 Pseudimbrasia
 Pseudobunaea
 Rohaniella
 Ubaena

Tribe Micragonini Cockerell in Packard, 1914
 Carnegia
 Decachorda
 Goodia
 Holocerina
 Ludia
 Micragone
 Orthogonioptilum
 Pseudoludia
 Vegetia

Tribe Saturniini Boisduval, 1837
 Actias – Asian-American moon moths
 Agapema (sometimes included in Saturnia)
 Antheraea – tussar moths
 Antheraeopsis
 Argema – African moon moths
 Caligula (sometimes included in Saturnia or Rinaca)
 Calosaturnia (sometimes included in Saturnia)
 Ceranchia
 Copaxa
 Cricula
 Eudia (mostly included in Saturnia)
 Graellsia
 Lemaireia
 Loepa
 Loepantheraea
 Neodiphthera
 Neoris (mostly included in Saturnia)
 Opodiphthera
 Pararhodia
 Perisomena (sometimes included in Saturnia)
 Rinaca
 Saturnia – typical emperor moths
 Solus
 Syntherata

Tribe Urotini
 Antherina
 Antistathmoptera
 Eosia
 Eudaemonia
 Maltagorea
 Parusta
 Pselaphelia
 Pseudantheraea
 Pseudaphelia
 Sinobirma
 Tagoropsis
 Urota
 Usta

Incertae sedis
 Adafroptilum

References

 
Saturniidae